Macau participated in the 1990 Asian Games held in Beijing, China from September 22, 1990 to October 7, 1990. This was Macau's first participation in the Asian Games. Wong Tong Ieong was the only medalist for Macau, who won the silver medal in the men's nanquan event of the wushu competition.

References 

Nations at the 1990 Asian Games
1990
Asian Games